The Arab Club Champions Cup is an annual regional club football competition organised by the Union of Arab Football Associations (UAFA) and contested by top-division clubs from the Arab world. The tournament is contested by a total of 37 teams from the Asian Football Confederation and the Confederation of African Football.

Founded in 1981, the tournament was held alongside the Arab Cup Winners' Cup and the Arab Super Cup throughout the 1990s and early 2000s, until the Cup Winners' Cup and Super Cup were merged with the Champions Cup in 2002. The tournament's first ever champions were Iraqi club Al-Shorta, who defeated Lebanese side Nejmeh in the final over two legs in 1982.

Saudi Arabian clubs have accumulated the most victories, with eight wins. The title has been won by 19 clubs, eight of which have won the title more than once. Since the tournament was merged with the Cup Winners' Cup, only ES Sétif of Algeria have managed consecutive wins, successfully defending their title in 2008. Defunct Iraqi club Al-Rasheed and Tunisian side Espérance de Tunis share the record for most titles, with three each. The reigning champions are Raja CA of Morocco, who won their second title in 2020.

History

1981–1988: Asian clubs in control
The Union of Arab Football Associations (UAFA) decided to create a competition for champions of Arab countries after the end of the 1979–80 season. Domestic champions from UAFA's member nations were invited to compete, but after several withdrawals, only three teams from Iraq, Lebanon and Jordan ended up participating. The competition, known as the Arab Club Championship for League Champions, kicked off on 19 June 1981 with Lebanese champions Nejmeh beating Jordanian champions Al-Ahli 2–1. Nejmeh's Jamal Al-Khatib was the scorer of the first ever Arab Club Champions Cup goal. Nejmeh and Al-Shorta competed in the inaugural final in February 1982, with Al-Shorta winning 4–2 on aggregate at Al-Shaab Stadium in Baghdad to be crowned the first ever champions of the Arab world.

The tournament was not held the following year but returned in 1984 in a round-robin format, and Al-Ettifaq earned the first title for a Saudi Arabian club that year. With the number of participants increasing year upon year, UAFA introduced preliminary qualifying rounds that preceded the final round-robin tournament, before they changed the format of the final tournament in 1987 to one that consisted of a group stage followed by a knockout stage. UAFA also started to allow countries to have more than one participant in 1987, with two Saudi Arabian clubs (Al-Ittihad and Al-Hilal) and two Iraqi clubs (Al-Rasheed and Al-Jaish) competing.

Al-Rasheed of Iraq dominated the competition during these years, becoming the first team to win three consecutive championships in 1985, 1986 and 1987, while Al-Ettifaq won their title back in 1988. From 1981 to 1988, no team from the Confederation of African Football (CAF) was able to win the tournament and all winners were from the Asian Football Confederation (AFC).

1989–2001: Even between Asian and African sides
An African club became champions of the Arab world for the first time in 1989 as Wydad Casablanca of Morocco beat Saudi Arabia's Al-Hilal in the final. That same year, UAFA founded a new annual competition that would be held alongside the Arab Club Champions Cup; it was called the Arab Cup Winners' Cup and was a competition for the cup winners of Arab countries, with a similar format to that of the Champions Cup. In 1992, UAFA introduced the Arab Super Cup which was an annual round-robin competition between the winners and runners-up of both the Champions Cup and Cup Winners' Cup.

From 1989 until 2001, there were six winners from CAF and five from the AFC. Four of the eleven winners during this time were from Saudi Arabia, while Espérance de Tunis earned the first win for a Tunisian team in 1993, Al-Ahly became the first Egyptian champions in 1995, WA Tlemcen earned Algeria's first title in 1998 and Al-Sadd won the first title for a Qatari club in 2001.

2002–present: African teams dominate after unification
In 2002, UAFA made a decision that changed the face of Arab continental football. With the increasing number of commitments facing Arab clubs in the modern era, UAFA decided to merge the Cup Winners' Cup and Super Cup with the Champions Cup to form the Arab Unified Club Championship, which would be the only UAFA club tournament. Two editions of the tournament were played under this name, with Al-Ahli of Saudi Arabia winning in 2002 and Zamalek winning in 2003. After the 2003 edition, ART became the tournament's sponsor and UAFA then changed the name of the tournament to the Arab Champions League so that its name was similar to other elite continental tournaments such as the UEFA Champions League, CAF Champions League, AFC Champions League and OFC Champions League. Tunisia's CS Sfaxien became the first winners of the Champions League era. From the 2004–05 edition onwards, UAFA reintroduced two-legged finals, which had not been used since the very first edition of the tournament.

After title wins for Saudi Arabia's Al-Ittihad and Morocco's Raja Casablanca, ES Sétif of Algeria became the first back-to-back winners in the Champions League era by claiming both the 2006–07 and 2007–08 titles. After the 2008–09 edition won by Espérance de Tunis of Tunisia, UAFA ran into organisational problems due to issues with the tournament's new sponsor. This prevented the tournament from being held for four years until it resurfaced in 2012–13 under the new name of UAFA Club Cup, with Algeria's USM Alger earning their first title. However, UAFA then ran into the same problems as before which led to another four-year hiatus. The competition was held again in 2017 under the name of Arab Club Championship with 20 competing teams; the group stage and knockout stage were held in Egypt and the final was held as a single leg. Espérance de Tunis were crowned champions making them the joint-most successful team in the competition's history.

The number of teams doubled to 40 for the 2018–19 season where the competition was renamed to Arab Club Champions Cup and changed its format to become a knockout competition from the Round of 32 onwards. Out of the twelve champions crowned from 2002 to 2020, ten of them were from Africa and only two were from Asia.

Records and statistics

Finals

Performances by club

Performances by country

Performances by continent

All-time top scorers

See also
 Arab Cup Winners' Cup
 Arab Super Cup
 Arab Nations Cup

References

External links
UAFA Competitions - Al-Shorta SC Website

 
Union of Arab Football Associations club competitions
Recurring sporting events established in 1981
1981 establishments in Africa
1981 establishments in Asia